Pleasant Grove Township may refer to the following townships in the United States:

 Pleasant Grove Township, Coles County, Illinois
 Pleasant Grove Township, Des Moines County, Iowa
 Pleasant Grove Township, Floyd County, Iowa
 Pleasant Grove Township, Greenwood County, Kansas
 Pleasant Grove Township, Olmsted County, Minnesota